Serhiy Makarov (born 8 June 1977 in Zhdanov, Donetsk Oblast) is a Ukrainian sports functionary and was a president of the Professional Football League of Ukraine (PFL).

Biography
Makarov graduated from the Donetsk State Technical University in management of foreign economic activity and later information computer systems and technologies.

At least since 2009 Makarov worked for PFL, at first as a director of information and analytical center, and later since 2010 as an executive director. During that period Makarov received a certification in sports management under the programs НУФВСУ and CIES which were provided by FFU along with FIFA.

On 27 June 2014 Makarov won the presidential election of PFL becoming its fifth president. On 5 August 2020 Makarov resigned from his position.

References

External links
 Biography (cached copy). FC Desna Chernihiv.
 The epoch of Makarov. What kind of PFL was in 2014–2020 (Эра Макарова. Какой была ПФЛ в 2014-2020 годах?). Sport Arena. 6 August 2020

1977 births
Living people
People from Mariupol
Ukrainian businesspeople
Professional Football League of Ukraine presidents